Echinocereus websterianus, commonly known as the San Pedro Nolasco hedgehog cactus or Webster's hedgehog cactus is a species of cactus. It is named after American philanthropist Gertrude Webster, who cofounded the Desert Botanical Garden in Phoenix, Arizona.

Description 
It may grow in a clumping fashion, with up to 50 other basal branches forming the clump. The pink, violet, or white flower blooms during the day. Flowers do not readily detach once pollinated, which can lead to stem rot. Blooming occurs in the hot months of June and July, once the plant reaches maturity at between 7 and 10 years old. Blooms stay open for 2 or 3 days.

Taxonomy 
It is very similar to Echinocereus grandis and may be the same species.

Distribution 
It is likely native to San Pedro Nolasco Island in the Gulf of California, though it may have some distribution in mainland Baja. It occurs on other islands in the Gulf of California, including Isla San Lorenzo Sur and Isla Las Ánimas.

Cultivation 
This cactus is easily propagated, but its slow maturation complicates cultivation. It fetches a high price due to its showy flowers. In cultivation, it should be watered regularly between March and October, and given a deep pot to ensure adequate drainage. Strong sunlight overwinter is necessary to ensure flowering. It is very difficult to repot and shows handling marks with even a ginger touch. Instead it is preferable to simply cut off pups or the top of the plant and propagate those.

References 

Flora of Mexico
websterianus